The Fourth cabinet of Napoleon III was formed on 17 July 1869.

Ministers

The ministers were:
 President of the Council of State: Prosper de Chasseloup-Laubat
 Justice and Religious Affairs: Jean-Baptiste Duvergier
 Foreign Affairs: Henri La Tour d'Auvergne
 Interior: Adolphe de Forcade La Roquette
 Finance: Pierre Magne
 War: Adolphe Niel jusqu'au 13 août 1869
 Navy and Colonies: Charles Rigault de Genouilly
 Public Education: Louis Olivier Bourbeau
 Public Works: Edmond Valléry Gressier
 Agriculture and Commerce : Alfred Le Roux
 Imperial Household and Beaux-Arts: Jean-Baptiste Philibert Vaillant

Adolphe Niel died on 21 August 1869 and was replaced as Minister of War by Edmond Le Bœuf.

References

Sources

French governments
1869 establishments in France
1870 disestablishments in France
Cabinets established in 1869
Cabinets disestablished in 1870
Napoleon III